652 Jubilatrix is a minor planet orbiting the Sun. It was discovered on 4 November 1907 by Austrian astronomer Johann Palisa, and was named in honor of the 60th anniversary of the reign of Franz Joseph. It is a member of the Maria dynamic family.

References

External links
 
 

Background asteroids
19071104
Jubilatrix
Jubilatrix